Adar is a month of the Hebrew calendar. In leap years there is a month Adar_I and a month Adar_II. 

Adar may also refer to:

 Adar (surname)
 Adar (Star Wars), a creature in the Star Wars universe
 `Adar, a village in Yemen
 Adar, Iran, a village in Iran
 Adar River in the state of Upper Nile, South Sudan
 Adar oilfield in South Sudan
 Atar or Adar, a Middle Persian term for Zoroastrian fire
 ADAR, a type of Adenosine deaminase acting on RNA
 "Adar" (The Lord of the Rings: The Rings of Power), an episode of the first season of The Lord of the Rings: The Rings of Power